BIMU-8 is a drug which acts as a 5-HT4 receptor selective agonist. BIMU-8 was one of the first compounds of this class. The main action of BIMU-8 is to increase the rate of respiration by activating an area of the brain stem known as the pre-Botzinger complex.

Use 
The most obvious practical use of BIMU-8 is to combine it with opioid analgesic drugs in order to counteract the dangerous respiratory depression which can occur when opioids are used in excessive doses. BIMU-8 does not affect the pleasurable or painkilling properties of opiates, which means that if combined with BIMU-8, large therapeutic doses of opiates could theoretically be given to humans without risking a decrease in breathing rate. Studies have shown BIMU-8 to be effective in rats at counteracting the respiratory depression caused by the potent opioid fentanyl, which has caused many accidental deaths in humans. However, no human trials of BIMU-8 have yet been carried out.

Other studies have suggested a role for 5-HT4 agonists in learning and memory, and BIMU-8 was found to increase conditioned responses in mice, so this drug might also be useful for improving memory in humans.

Some other selective 5-HT4 agonists such as mosapride and tegaserod (the only 5-HT4 agonists currently licensed for use in humans) have been found not to reduce respiratory depression. On the other hand, another 5-HT4 agonist, zacopride, does inhibit respiratory depression in a similar manner to BIMU-8.

This suggests that either the anti-respiratory depression action is mediated via a specific subtype of the 5-HT4 receptor which is activated by BIMU-8 and zacopride, but not by mosapride or tegaserod, or alternatively there may be functional selectivity involved whereby BIMU-8 and zacopride produce a different physiological response following 5-HT4 binding compared to other 5-HT4 agonists. Another alternative to this is that the 5-HT4 agonist currently available for use in humans do not have great enough potency or bioavailability in the brain to elicit the same effects.

Other activity
Along with several other 5-HT4 ligands, BIMU-8 was also found to possess significant affinity for the sigma receptors, acting as a σ2 antagonist. It is unclear as yet what contribution this additional activity makes to the pharmacological profile of BIMU-8 and other 5-HT4 ligands that also show sigma affinity.

See also
 C19H26N4O2

References 

Respiratory agents
Antidotes
Serotonin receptor agonists
Tropanes
Benzimidazoles
Ureas
Lactams
Isopropyl compounds